Sports Champions 2 is a 2012 sports video game developed by San Diego Studio and Zindagi Games and published by Sony Computer Entertainment for PlayStation 3, which utilizes PlayStation Move. It is the sequel to Sports Champions. New functions include boxing, golf, bowling, skiing, and tennis.

See also
Wii Sports
Wii Sports Resort
Kinect Sports
Sports Champions

References

2012 video games
Bowling video games
Boxing video games
Golf video games
Multiple-sport video games
PlayStation 3 games
PlayStation 3-only games
PlayStation Move-compatible games
PlayStation Move-only games
Skiing video games
Sony Interactive Entertainment games
Tennis video games
Video games developed in the United States
Video games scored by David Bergeaud
Video game sequels
Multiplayer and single-player video games
Video games using Havok
San Diego Studio games